Convention Center/South 15th Street station is a light rail station on Link light rail's T Line in Tacoma, Washington, United States. The station officially opened for service on August 22, 2003, and is located almost adjacent to the Greater Tacoma Convention and Trade Center. The heart of the downtown business core is also accessible from the station, with several major employers headquartered nearby.

Artwork at the station includes colored panels in the roof and towers of rocks, evoking a Buddhist temple that used to exist in the area.

References 

Link light rail stations in Pierce County, Washington
Railway stations in the United States opened in 2003
2003 establishments in Washington (state)
Buildings and structures in Tacoma, Washington
Transportation in Tacoma, Washington